Monnea decora is a species of beetle in the family Carabidae, the only species in the genus Monnea.

References

Lebiinae